Lamjavyn Gündalai is a Mongolian politician. He has been a member of parliament since 2000 and served as Minister of Health from January 2006 to January 2007.

Gündalai was born in Khatgal, Khövsgöl Aimag in 1963. After completing the local middle school in 1982, he studied medicine at the Martin Luther University in Halle from 1984 to 1991. Afterwards, he entered the business and founded the GMET and Batsarai companies.

In the 2000 parliamentary election, he won the constituency no.45 in northwestern Khövsgöl as an independent candidate but entered the Democratic Party in the same year. His first election period was overshadowed by a feud with then Minister of Justice, Tsendiin Nyamdorj, over alleged dissemination of secret documents to foreign secret service. The affair culminated in a libel charge against Gündalai and Gündalai's detention from a plane headed to Seoul in August 2003.

Gündalai was re-elected in the 2004 parliamentary election. In late 2005, he founded his own Party, the People's Party or Ард түмний нам, with a party structure, allegedly modeled after the political structure of the Great Mongol Empire. After the controversial establishment of an MPRP-led government in January 2006, he was appointed Minister of Health but ousted in January 2007 after accusations focusing on failed staffing policies, negligence, and inadequate behaviour towards representatives of international organisations.

In April 2008, Gündalai left the People's Party and re-entered the Democratic Party. He was one of two DP candidates from Khövsgöl who were elected into the new parliament on June 29th, 2008.

Personal Life
Gundalai had a previous relationship with his wife in which he fathered two children in 1991 and 1995, but then had an illegitimate child with Azzaya Lamjav and left his first wife and children to marry her in 1999. Then in late 2004, he had another child and another in 2006. In 25 years Gundalai had 1 boy and 4 girls.

Also, he is famous for his remarkable quotes, such as "Mongolooroo baigaasai”, " Language has legs" and his catchphrase: "Gundalai ah shigee uuna"

Also, he has told immigration officers to search him up on wikipedia about his identity.

References

External links 
 Personal homepage (in Mongolian)
 Members of the Mongolian government as of early 2006 (in German)

1963 births
Living people
People from Khövsgöl Province
Members of the State Great Khural
Martin Luther University of Halle-Wittenberg alumni
Democratic Party (Mongolia) politicians
Health ministers of Mongolia